Scarlett Werner (née Kotschwara; born 21 November 1984) is a German former professional tennis player.

Her highest WTA singles ranking is world No. 277, which she reached on 31 October 2011. Her career-high in doubles is 199, achieved on 10 November 2003. She had a career-high junior singles ranking of world No. 10, on 17 January 2000.

ITF Circuit finals

Singles: 7 (5 titles, 2 runner-ups)

Doubles: 14 (7 titles, 7 runner-ups)

External links
 
 
 

1984 births
Living people
Tennis players from Munich
German female tennis players